The 2011 Boston Red Sox season was the 111th season in the franchise's Major League Baseball history.  Before the season, the Red Sox were favored to win the American League East and reach the World Series, with some comparing the team to the 1927 New York Yankees. With a record of 90 wins and 72 losses, the Red Sox finished third in their division, seven games behind the Yankees.

After leading the Tampa Bay Rays by nine games in the AL wild card race on September 3—when their odds of reaching the postseason peaked at 99.6%—the Red Sox lost 18 of their final 24 games. On the last day of the season, September 28, a ninth-inning Red Sox loss to the Baltimore Orioles via a blown-save, coupled with a 12-inning comeback victory by the Rays over the Yankees, made the Rays the AL wild card winners and eliminated the Red Sox from playoff contention.

Offseason

November
11/04/10-Detroit Tigers traded Brent Dlugach to Boston Red Sox.
11/07/10-3B Adrián Beltré elected to free agency.
LF Bill Hall elected to free agency.
2B Felipe López elected to free agent.
C Víctor Martínez elected to free agency.
C Jason Varitek elected to free agency.
11/08/10-Activated RHP Junichi Tazawa from the 60-day disabled list.
Activated CF Mike Cameron from the 60-day disabled list.
Activated 1B Kevin Youkilis from the 60-day disabled list.
Activated LF Jacoby Ellsbury from the 60-day disabled list.
11/12/10-Traded LHP Dustin Richardson to the Florida Marlins for LHP Andrew Miller.
11/15/10-Claimed RHP Taylor Buchholz off waivers from Toronto Blue Jays.
11/19/10-Called up Luis Exposito from Portland Sea Dogs.
Called up Stolmy Pimentel from Salem Red Sox.
Called up Óscar Tejeda from Salem Red Sox.
11/24/10-Claimed Jordan Parraz off waivers from Kansas City Royals.

December
12/03/10-2B Nate Spears assigned to Boston Red Sox.
RHP Santo Luis assigned to Boston Red Sox.
LHP Hideki Okajima elected free agency.
RHP Taylor Buchholz elected free agency.
LHP Andrew Miller elected free agency.
Signed free agent RHP Jason Bergmann.
Signed free agent RHP Brandon Duckworth.
Signed free agent 2B Drew Sutton.
12/06/10-Portland Sea Dogs traded 1B Anthony Rizzo and RHP Casey Kelly to San Antonio Missions; San Diego Padres traded 1B Adrián González to Boston Red Sox and Greenville Drive traded CF Reymond Fuentes to Fort Wayne TinCaps.
12/10/10-Signed free agent C Jason Varitek.
12/11/10-Signed free agent LF Carl Crawford.
12/16/10-Traded CF Eric Patterson to San Diego Padres.
Signed free agent LHP Andrew Miller.
Signed free agent RHP Clevelan Santeliz.
Signed free agent LHP Randy Williams.
Signed free agent LHP Rich Hill.
Signed free agent LHP Lenny DiNardo.
Signed free agent LHP Matt Albers.
12/18/10-Signed free agent RHP Dan Wheeler.
12/21/10-Designated SS Brent Dlugach for assignment.
Signed free agent RHP Bobby Jenks.
12/23/10-Outrighted Brent Dlugach to Pawtucket Red Sox.

January
1/05/11-Designated Matt Fox for assignment.
Claimed Max Ramírez off waivers from Texas Rangers.
1/06/11-Signed free agent RHP Tony Peña Jr.
1/10/11-Signed free agent LHP Hideki Okajima.
1/13/11-Released RHP Matt Fox.

2011 Spring training
Fans gathered at Fenway Park on February 8, 2011 in order to kick off the Red Sox preseason by celebrating Truck Day. The first full team workout of the preseason took place on February 19. Playing other teams in the Grapefruit League the Red Sox finished with 14 wins and 19 losses.

2011 Season
The Red Sox made several high profile roster moves hoping to return to postseason success after missing the playoffs in 2010. During the offseason the Red Sox traded for first baseman Adrián González, and they followed that move up by signing star outfielder Carl Crawford.

Opening day

The Red Sox kicked off the year against the defending AL Pennant Winners, the Texas Rangers in Arlington, Texas, on Friday, April 1.

Lineup

Source:

The Red Sox home opener was Friday, April 8, against the rival New York Yankees.

Pitching woes
On May 15, John Lackey and Daisuke Matsuzaka were placed on the disabled list. On June 10, Matsuzaka underwent season-ending Tommy John surgery. Clay Buchholz was afflicted with what would be diagnosed as a stress fracture in his back and was also put on the disabled list on June 17, where he would remain for the rest of the season. Other pitchers including Rich Hill and Bobby Jenks spent significant time on the disabled list. The Red Sox obtained Érik Bédard from the Seattle Mariners seconds before the trading deadline, after Kyle Weiland (who was highlighted by his ejection on his MLB debut) proved ineffective. Starting pitchers John Lackey and ace Jon Lester were ineffective down the stretch, as the Red Sox crashed down to a 7-20 finish, blowing a 9-game wild card lead that they held entering September. Josh Beckett missed a start early in the month after spraining his ankle in a previous start, and was ineffective in most of his September starts after that point.

Collapse

The Red Sox became the first team in the history of Major League Baseball to have a nine-game lead in September and fail to make the playoffs that season, thanks to their 7-20 record in the final month of the regular season. In the days following this historic collapse, the front office and manager Terry Francona decided to part ways, and not exercise either of the additional year options on Francona's contract.

After the regular season ended, General Manager Theo Epstein entered talks with the Chicago Cubs to interview for the National League club's vacant General Manager position. The Cubs offered Epstein the position of President of Baseball Operations, and he accepted.  After five months of negotiations, the Red Sox and Cubs agreed to the compensation the Red Sox would receive for Epstein. The Cubs acquired minor-league first baseman Jair Bogaerts (twin brother of Xander Bogaerts) from the Red Sox, and the Red Sox received pitchers Chris Carpenter and Aaron Kurcz.

Soon after the season ended, stories broke in the local media about several of Boston's starting pitchers, including Jon Lester, Josh Beckett, and John Lackey, had been playing video games, eating fried chicken, and drinking beer in the clubhouse and dugout during games when they were not pitching. Jon Lester was the first to speak publicly about the allegations, and admitted to eating and drinking in the clubhouse during games, though infrequently, but denied that these actions ever took place in the dugout.

2011 roster

Season standings

Record vs. opponents

Game log 

|-  style="text-align:center; background:#fbb;"
| 1 || April 1 || @ Rangers || 9–5 || Oliver (1–0) || Bard (0–1) || || 50,146  || Rangers Ballpark || 0–1 || L1
|-  style="text-align:center; background:#fbb;"
| 2 || April 2 || @ Rangers || 12–5 || Lewis (1–0) || Lackey (0–1) ||  || 48,356 || Rangers Ballpark || 0–2 || L2
|-  style="text-align:center; background:#fbb;"
| 3 || April 3 || @ Rangers || 5–1 || Harrison (1–0)   ||  Buchholz (0–1) || || 46,326 || Rangers Ballpark || 0–3 || L3
|-  style="text-align:center; background:#fbb;"
| 4 || April 5 || @ Indians || 3–1 || Tomlin (1–0)  || Beckett (0–1)  || Perez (1) || 9,025 || Progressive Field || 0–4 || L4
|-  style="text-align:center; background:#fbb;"
| 5 || April 6 || @ Indians || 8–4 || Perez (1–0) || Matsuzaka (0–1) || || 9,523 || Progressive Field || 0–5 || L5
|-  style="text-align:center; background:#fbb;"
| 6 || April 7 || @ Indians || 1–0 || Perez (2–0)  ||Bard (0–2)  || Perez (2) ||10,594  || Progressive Field || 0–6 || L6
|-  style="text-align:center; background:#bfb;"
| 7 || April 8 || Yankees || 9–6 || Lackey (1–1) || Colón (0–1) || Papelbon (1) || 37,178 || Fenway Park || 1–6 || W1
|-  style="text-align:center; background:#fbb;"
| 8 || April 9 || Yankees || 9–4 || Robertson (2–0) || Buchholz (0–2) ||  || 37,488 || Fenway Park || 1–7 || L1
|-  style="text-align:center; background:#bfb;"
| 9 || April 10 || Yankees || 4–0 || Beckett (1–1)|| Sabathia (0–1) ||  || 37,861 || Fenway Park || 2–7 || W1
|-  style="text-align:center; background:#fbb;"
| 10 || April 11 || Rays || 16–5 || Hellickson (1–1) || Matsuzaka (0–2)  || || 37,568 || Fenway Park || 2–8 || L1
|-  style="text-align:center; background:#fbb;"
| 11 || April 12 || Rays || 3–2 || Price (1–2) || Lester (0–1) ||  || 37,015 || Fenway Park || 2–9 || L2
|-  style="text-align:center; background:#bbb;"
| 12 || April 13 || Rays || colspan=7| Postponed (rain); Makeup: August 16 || Rain1
|-  style="text-align:center; background:#fbb;"
| 12 || April 15 || Blue Jays || 7–6 || Cecil (1–1) || Jenks (0–1) || Rauch (3) || 37,467 || Fenway Park || 2–10 || L3
|-  style="text-align:center; background:#bfb"
| 13 || April 16 || Blue Jays || 4–1 || Beckett (2–1) || Reyes (0–2) || Papelbon (2) || 37,310 || Fenway Park || 3–10 || W1
|-  style="text-align:center; background:#bfb"
| 14 || April 17 || Blue Jays || 8–1 || Lester (1–1) || Litsch (1–1) ||  || 37,802 || Fenway Park || 4–10 || W2
|-  style="text-align:center; background:#bfb"
| 15 || April 18 || Blue Jays || 9–1 || Matsuzaka (1–2) || Romero (1–2) ||  || 37,916 || Fenway Park || 5–10 || W3
|-  style="text-align:center; background:#fbb"
| 16 || April 19 || @ Athletics || 5–0 || Anderson (1–1) || Lackey (1–2) ||  || 25,230 || McAfee Coliseum || 5–11 || L1
|-  style="text-align:center; background:#bfb"
| 17 || April 20 || @ Athletics || 5–3 || Buchholz (1–2) || González (2–1) || Papelbon (3) || 29,045 || McAfee Coliseum || 6–11 || W1
|-  style="text-align:center; background:#bfb"
| 18 || April 21 || @ Angels || 4–2 (11) || Jenks (1–1) || Thompson (0–1) || Papelbon (4) || 37,003 || Angel Stadium || 7–11 || W2
|-  style="text-align:center; background:#bfb"
| 19 || April 22 || @ Angels || 4–3 || Lester (2–1) || Haren (4–1) || Papelbon (5) || 39,005 || Angel Stadium || 8–11 || W3
|-  style="text-align:center; background:#bfb"
| 20 || April 23 || @ Angels || 5–0 || Matsuzaka (2–2) || Santana (0–3) ||  || 40,025 || Angel Stadium || 9–11 || W4
|-  style="text-align:center; background:#bfb"
| 21 || April 24 || @ Angels || 7–0 || Lackey (2–2) || Palmer (1–1) ||  ||35,107|| Angel Stadium || 10–11 || W5
| 22 || April 26 || @ Orioles || 4–1 || Britton (4–1) || Buchholz (1–3) || Gregg (3) || 18,938 || Camden Yards || 10–12 || L1
|-  style="text-align:center; background:#fbb"
| 23 || April 27 || @ Orioles || 5–4 || Uehara (1–0) || Bard (0–3) || Gregg (4) || 15,514 || Camden Yards || 10–13 || L2
|-  style="text-align:center; background:#bfb"
| 24 || April 28 || @ Orioles || 6–2 || Lester (3–1) || Johnson (1–1) ||  || 21,209 || Camden Yards || 11–13 || W1
|-  style="text-align:center; background:#fbb"
| 25 || April 29 || Mariners || 5–4 || Vargas (1–2) || Jenks (1–2) || League (6) || 37,845 || Fenway Park || 11–14 || L1
|-  style="text-align:center; background:#fbb"
| 26 || April 30 || Mariners || 2–0 || Fister (2–3)
|| Lackey (2–3) || League (7) || 37,901 || Fenway Park || 11–15 || L2
|-

|-  style="text-align:center; background:#bfb"
| 27 || May 1 || Mariners || 3–2 || Papelbon (1–0) || Wright (0–1) ||  || 37,079 || Fenway Park || 12–15 || W1
|-  style="text-align:center; background:#bfb"
| 28 || May 2 || Angels || 9–5 || Buchholz (2–3) || Weaver (6–1) || || 37,017 || Fenway Park || 13–15 || W2
|-  style="text-align:center; background:#bfb"
| 29 || May 3 || Angels || 7–3 || Lester (4–1) || Haren (4–2) || || 37,043 || Fenway Park || 14–15 || W3
|-  style="text-align:center; background:#fbb"
| 30 || May 4 || Angels || 5–3 (13) || Bell (1–0) || Matsuzaka (2–3) ||  || 37,037 || Fenway Park || 14–16 || L1
|-  style="text-align:center; background:#fbb"
| 31 || May 5 || Angels || 11–0 || Piñeiro (1–0) || Lackey (2–4) ||  || 37,013 || Fenway Park || 14–17 || L2
|-  style="text-align:center; background:#fbb"
| 32 || May 6 || Twins || 9–2 || Baker (2–2) || Wakefield (0–1) ||  || 37,798 || Fenway Park || 14–18 || L3
|-  style="text-align:center; background:#bfb"
| 33 || May 7 || Twins || 4–0 || Buchholz (3–3) || Duensing (2–2) ||  || 37,234 || Fenway Park || 15–18 || W1
|-  style="text-align:center; background:#bfb"
| 34 || May 8 || Twins || 9–5 || Matsuzaka (3–3) || Pavano (2–4) ||  || 37,526 || Fenway Park || 16–18 || W2
|-  style="text-align:center; background:#bfb"
| 35 || May 9 || Twins || 2–1 || Okajima (1–0) || Hoey (0–1) ||  || 37,276 || Fenway Park || 17–18 || W3
|-  style="text-align:center; background:#fbb"
| 36 || May 10 || @ Blue Jays || 7–6 (10) || Villanueva (1–0) || Albers (0–1) ||  || 17,820 || Rogers Centre || 17–19 || L1
| 37 || May 11 || @ Blue Jays || 9–3 || Litsch (4–2) || Lackey (2–5) ||  || 19,163 || Rogers Centre || 17–20 || L2
|-  style="text-align:center; background:#bfb"
| 38 || May 13 || @ Yankees || 5–4 || Buchholz (4–3) || Colón (2–2) || Papelbon (6) || 48,254 || Yankee Stadium || 18–20 || W1
|-  style="text-align:center; background:#bfb"
| 39 || May 14 || @ Yankees || 6–0 || Beckett (3–1) || Sabathia (3–3) ||  || 48,790 || Yankee Stadium || 19–20 || W2
|-  style="text-align:center; background:#bfb"
| 40 || May 15 || @ Yankees || 7–5 || Lester (5–1) || García (2–3) || Papelbon (7) || 46,945 || Yankee Stadium || 20–20 || W3
|-  style="text-align:center; background:#bfb"
| 41 || May 16 || Orioles || 8–7 || Aceves (1–0) || Gregg (0–1) ||  || 37,138 || Fenway Park || 21–20 || W4
|-  style="text-align:center; background:#bbb"
| 42 || May 17 || Orioles || colspan=7| Postponed (rain); Makeup: September 19 || Rain2
|-  style="text-align:center; background:#bfb"
| 42 || May 18 || Tigers || 1–0 || Bard (1–3) || Schlereth (0–1) || Papelbon (8) || 37,311 || Fenway Park || 22–20 || W5
|-  style="text-align:center; background:#bfb"
| 43 || May 19 || Tigers || 4–3 || Papelbon (2–0) || Alburquerque (0–1)  || || 37,660 || Fenway Park || 23–20 ||W6
|-  style="text-align:center; background:#bfb"
| 44 || May 20 || Cubs || 15–5 || Lester (6–1) || Davis (0–2)  || Atchison (1) || 37,140 || Fenway Park || 24–20 ||W7
|-  style="text-align:center; background:#fbb"
| 45 || May 21 || Cubs || 9–3 || Marshall (2–0) || Albers (0–2) ||  || 37,798 || Fenway Park || 24–21 || L1
|-  style="text-align:center; background:#bfb"
| 46 || May 22 || Cubs || 5–1 || Wakefield (1–1) || Russell (1–5) ||  || 37,688 || Fenway Park || 25–21 || W1
|-  style="text-align:center; background:#fbb"
| 47 || May 23 || @ Indians || 3–2 || Smith (2–1) || Bard (1–4) || Perez (13) || 19,225 || Progressive Field || 25–22 || L1
|-  style="text-align:center; background:#bfb"
| 48 || May 24 || @ Indians || 4–2 || Beckett (4–1) || Carmona (3–5) || Papelbon (9) || 23,752 || Progressive Field || 26–22 || W1
|-  style="text-align:center; background:#bfb"
| 49 || May 25 || @ Indians || 14–2 || Lester (7–1) || Talbot (1–1) ||  || 26,408 || Progressive Field || 27–22 || W2
|-  style="text-align:center; background:#bfb"
| 50 || May 26 || @ Tigers || 14–1 (8) || Aceves (2–0)  || Scherzer (6–2) ||  || 24,213 || Comerica Park || 28–22 || W3
|-  style="text-align:center; background:#bfb"
| 51 || May 27 || @ Tigers || 9–3 || Wakefield (2–1) || Porcello (4–3) ||  || 34,046 || Comerica Park || 29–22 || W4
|-  style="text-align:center; background:#bbb"
| 52 || May 28 || @ Tigers || colspan=7| Postponed (rain); Makeup: May 29 || Rain3 
|-  style="text-align:center; background:#bfb"
| 52 || May 29 (Game 1)|| @ Tigers || 4–3 || Albers (1–2) || Valverde (2–2) || Papelbon (10) || 36,285 || Comerica Park || 30–22 || W5
|-  style="text-align:center; background:#fbb"
| 53 || May 29 (Game 2) || @ Tigers || 3–0 || Verlander (5–3) || Beckett (4–2) || Valverde (12) || 39,873 || Comerica Park || 30–23 || L1
|-  style="text-align:center; background:#fbb"
| 54 || May 30 || White Sox || 7–3 || Peavy (2–0) || Lester (7–2) ||  || 37,463 || Fenway Park || 30–24 || L2
|-  style="text-align:center; background:#fbb"
| 55 || May 31 || White Sox || 10–7 || Humber (4–3) || Aceves (2–1) || Sale (2) || 37,269 || Fenway Park || 30–25 || L3
|-

|-  style="text-align:center; background:#fbb"
| 56 || June 1 || White Sox || 7–4 || Floyd (6–5) || Albers (1–3) || Santos (9) || 37,321 || Fenway Park || 30–26 || L4
|-  style="text-align:center; background:#bfb"
| 57 || June 3 || Athletics || 8–6 || Jenks (2–2) || Devine (0–1) ||  || 37,808 || Fenway Park || 31–26 || W1
|-  style="text-align:center; background:#bfb"
| 58 || June 4 || Athletics || 9–8 (14) || Aceves (3–1) || Moscoso (2–1) ||  || 37,485 || Fenway Park || 32–26 || W2
|-  style="text-align:center; background:#bfb"
| 59 || June 5 || Athletics || 6–3 || Lackey (3–5) || Anderson (3–6) || Bard (1) || 37,796  || Fenway Park || 33–26 || W3
|-  style="text-align:center; background:#bfb"
| 60 || June 7 || @ Yankees || 6–4 || Lester (8–2) || García (4–5) || Papelbon (12) || 48,450 || Yankee Stadium || 34–26 || W4
|-  style="text-align:center; background:#bfb"
| 61 || June 8 || @ Yankees || 11–6 || Wakefield (3–1) || Burnett (6–4) || Aceves (1) || 47,863 || Yankee Stadium || 35–26 || W5
|-  style="text-align:center; background:#bfb"
| 62 || June 9 || @ Yankees || 8–3 || Beckett (5–2)|| Sabathia (7–4) ||  || 48,845 || Yankee Stadium || 36–26 || W6
|-  style="text-align:center; background:#bfb"
| 63 || June 10 || @ Blue Jays || 5–1 || Buchholz (5–3) || Reyes (2–5) ||  || 28,588 || Rogers Centre || 37–26 || W7
|-  style="text-align:center; background:#bfb"
| 64 || June 11 || @ Blue Jays || 16–4 || Lackey (4–5) || Morrow (2–4) ||  || 39,437 || Rogers Centre || 38–26 || W8
|-  style="text-align:center; background:#bfb"
| 65 || June 12 || @ Blue Jays || 14–1 || Lester (9–2) || Drabek (4–5) ||  || 30,364 || Rogers Centre || 39–26 || W9
|-  style="text-align:center; background:#fbb"
| 66 || June 14 || @ Rays || 4–0 || Shields (6–4) || Wakefield (3–2)  ||  || 20,972 || Tropicana Field || 39–27 || L1
|-  style="text-align:center; background:#bfb"
| 67 || June 15 || @ Rays || 3–0 || Beckett (6–2) || Hellickson (7–5)
||  || 19,388 || Tropicana Field || 40–27 || W1
|-  style="text-align:center; background:#bfb"
| 68 || June 16 || @ Rays || 4–2 || Buchholz (6–3) || Price (7–6) || Papelbon (13) || 23,495 || Tropicana Field || 41–27 || W2
|-  style="text-align:center; background:#bfb"
| 69 || June 17 || Brewers || 10–4 || Lackey (5–5) || Estrada (1–4) ||  || 37,833 || Fenway Park || 42–27 || W3
|-  style="text-align:center; background:#fbb"
| 70 || June 18 || Brewers || 4–2 || Wolf (5–4) || Lester (9–3) || Axford (19) || 38,175 || Fenway Park || 42–28 || L1
|-  style="text-align:center; background:#bfb"
| 71 || June 19 || Brewers || 12–3 || Wakefield (4–2) || Gallardo (8–4) ||  || 37,903 || Fenway Park || 43–28 || W1
|-  style="text-align:center; background:#bfb"
| 72 || June 20 || Padres || 14–5 || Albers (2–3) || Luebke (1–2) ||  || 38,020 || Fenway Park || 44–28 || W2
|-  style="text-align:center; background:#fbb"
| 73 || June 21 || Padres || 5–4 || Qualls (4–3) || Wheeler (0–1) || Bell (19) || 38,422 || Fenway Park || 44–29 || L1
|-  style="text-align:center; background:#fbb"
| 74 || June 22 || Padres || 5–1 (8) || Richard (3–9) || Lackey (5–6) ||  || 37,419 || Fenway Park || 44–30 || L2
|-  style="text-align:center; background:#fbb"
| 75 || June 24 || @ Pirates || 3–1 || Malholm (4–8) || Lester (9–4) || Hanrahan (21) || 39,330 || PNC Park || 44–31 || L3
|-  style="text-align:center; background:#fbb"
| 76 || June 25 || @ Pirates || 6–4 || Karstens (5–4) ||  Wakefield (4–3) || Hanrahan (22) || 39,483 || PNC Park || 44–32 || L4
|-  style="text-align:center; background:#bfb"
| 77 || June 26 || @ Pirates || 4–2 || Miller (1–0) || Wood (0–2) || Papelbon (14) || 39,511 || PNC Park || 45–32 || W1
|-  style="text-align:center; background:#fbb"
| 78 || June 28 || @ Phillies || 5–0 || Lee (9–5) || Beckett (6–3) || || 45,714 || Citizens Bank Park || 45–33 || L1
|-  style="text-align:center; background:#fbb"
| 79 || June 29 || @ Phillies || 2–1 || Worley (3–1) || Lackey (5–7) || Bastardo (3) || 45,612 || Citizens Bank Park || 45–34 || L2
|-  style="text-align:center; background:#bfb"
| 80 || June 30 || @ Phillies || 5–2 || Lester (10–4) || Herndon (0–2) || Papelbon (15) || 45,810 || Citizens Bank Park || 46–34 || W1
|-

|-  style="text-align:center; background:#bfb"
| 81 || July 1 || @ Astros || 7–5 || Wheeler (1–1) || Escalona (1–1) || Papelbon (16) || 36,279 || Minute Maid Park || 47–34 || W2
|-  style="text-align:center; background:#bfb"
| 82 || July 2 || @ Astros || 10–4 || Miller (2–0) || Happ (3–10) || || 39,021 || Minute Maid Park || 48–34 || W3
|-  style="text-align:center; background:#bfb"
| 83 || July 3 || @ Astros || 2–1 || Beckett (7–3)  || Melancon (5–2) || Papelbon (17) || 38,035 || Minute Maid Park || 49–34 || W4
|-  style="text-align:center; background:#fbb"
| 84 || July 4 || Blue Jays || 9–7 || Morrow (5–4) || Lackey (5–8) || Francisco (10) || 38,072 || Fenway Park || 49–35 || L1
|-  style="text-align:center; background:#bfb"
| 85 || July 5 || Blue Jays || 3–2 || Albers (3–3) || Cecil (1–4) || Papelbon (18) || 37,745 || Fenway Park || 50–35 || W1
|-  style="text-align:center; background:#bfb"
| 86 || July 6 || Blue Jays || 6–4 || Wakefield (5–3) || Romero (7–8) || Papelbon (19) || 37,404 || Fenway Park || 51–35 || W2
|-  style="text-align:center; background:#bfb"
| 87 || July 7 || Orioles || 10–4 || Miller (3–0)  || Arrieta (9–6) ||  || 37,981 || Fenway Park || 52–35 || W3
|-  style="text-align:center; background:#bfb"
| 88 || July 8 || Orioles || 10–3 (brawl) || Beckett (8–3)  || Britton (6–7) ||  || 37,729  || Fenway Park || 53–35 || W4
|-  style="text-align:center; background:#bfb"
| 89 || July 9 || Orioles || 4–0 || Lackey (6–8) || Simón (1–2) ||  || 38,205 || Fenway Park || 54–35 || W5
|-  style="text-align:center; background:#bfb"
| 90 || July 10 || Orioles || 8–6 || Aceves (4–1) || Guthrie (3–12) || Papelbon (20) || 37,688 || Fenway Park || 55–35 || W6
|-  style="text-align:center; background:#fbb"
| 91 || July 15 || @ Rays || 9–6 || Price (9–7) || Miller (3–1) || Farnsworth (18) || 25,729 || Tropicana Field || 55–36 || L1
|-  style="text-align:center; background:#bfb"
| 92 || July 16 || @ Rays || 9–5 || Lackey (7–8) || Shields (8–8) ||  || 32,487 || Tropicana Field || 56–36 || W1
|-  style="text-align:center; background:#bfb"
| 93 || July 17 || @ Rays || 1–0 (16) || Aceves (5–1) || Russell (1–2) || Papelbon (21) || 21,504 || Tropicana Field || 57–36 || W2
|-  style="text-align:center; background:#bfb"
| 94 || July 18 || @ Orioles || 15–10 || Wheeler (2–1) || González (1–2) ||  || 27,924 || Camden Yards || 58–36 || W3
|-  style="text-align:center; background:#fbb"
| 95 || July 19 || @ Orioles || 6–2 || Guthrie (4–13) || Weiland (0–1) || Johnson (1) || 32,314 || Camden Yards || 58–37 || L1
|-  style="text-align:center; background:#bfb"
| 96 || July 20 || @ Orioles || 4–0 || Miller (4–1) || Arrieta (9–7) ||  || 35,174 || Camden Yards || 59–37 || W1
|-  style="text-align:center; background:#bfb"
| 97 || July 22 || Mariners || 7–4 || Lackey (8–8) || Hernández (8–9) || Papelbon (22) || 38,048 || Fenway Park || 60–37 || W2
|-  style="text-align:center; background:#bfb"
| 98 || July 23 || Mariners || 3–1 || Beckett (9–3) || Beavan (1–2) || Papelbon (23) || 38,115 || Fenway Park || 61–37 || W3
|-  style="text-align:center; background:#bfb"
| 99 || July 24 || Mariners || 12–8 || Wakefield (6–3) || Pineda (8–7) ||  || 37,650 || Fenway Park || 62–37 || W4
|-  style="text-align:center; background:#fbb"
| 100 || July 25 || Royals || 3–1 (14) || Coleman (1–2) || Williams (0–1) || Soria (18) || 37,727 || Fenway Park || 62–38 || L1
|-  style="text-align:center; background:#bfb"
| 101 || July 26 || Royals || 13–9 || Aceves (6–1) || Adcock (1–1) || || 37,460 || Fenway Park || 63–38 || W1
|-  style="text-align:center; background:#bfb"
| 102 || July 27 || Royals || 12–5 || Lackey (9–8) || Chen (5–4) || || 38,329 || Fenway Park || 64–38 || W2
|-  style="text-align:center; background:#fbb"
| 103 || July 28 || Royals || 4–3 || Hochevar (7–8) || Beckett (9–4) || Soria (19) || 37,822 || Fenway Park || 64–39 ||L1
|-  style="text-align:center; background:#fbb"
| 104 || July 29 || @ White Sox || 3–1 || Floyd (9–9) || Wakefield (6–4) || Santos (22) || 27,513 || U.S. Cellular Field || 64–40 || L2
|-  style="text-align:center; background:#bfb"
| 105 || July 30 || @ White Sox || 10–2 || Lester (10–4) || Humber (8–7) ||  || 33,919 || U.S. Cellular Field || 65–40 || W1
|-  style="text-align:center; background:#bfb"
| 106 || July 31 || @ White Sox || 5–3 || Aceves (7–1) || Crain (5–3) || Papelbon (24) || 28,278 || U.S. Cellular Field || 66–40 || W2
|-

|- style="text-align:center; background:#fbb"
| 107 || August 1 || Indians || 9–6 || Pérez (4–1) || Bard (1–5) ||  || 37,943 || Fenway Park || 66–41 || L1
|-  style="text-align:center; background:#bfb"
| 108 || August 2 || Indians || 3–2 || Papelbon (3–0) || Pestano (1–1) ||  || 38,101 || Fenway Park || 67–41 || W1
|-  style="text-align:center; background:#bfb"
| 109 || August 3 || Indians || 4–3 || Papelbon (4–0) || Smith (2–2) ||  || 38,172 || Fenway Park || 68–41 || W2
|-  style="text-align:center; background:#fbb"
| 110 || August 4 || Indians || 7–3 || Masterson (9–7) || Morales (0–2) ||  || 38,477 || Fenway Park || 68–42 || L1
|-  style="text-align:center; background:#fbb"
| 111 || August 5 || Yankees || 3–2 || Logan  (3–2) || Lester (11–5) || Rivera (29) || 38,006 || Fenway Park || 68–43 || L2
|-  style="text-align:center; background:#bfb"
| 112 || August 6 || Yankees || 10–4 || Lackey (10–8) || Sabathia (16–6) ||  || 37,416 || Fenway Park || 69–43 || W1
|-  style="text-align:center; background:#bfb"
| 113 || August 7 || Yankees || 3–2 (10) || Bard (2–5) || Hughes (2–4) ||  || 38,189 || Fenway Park || 70–43 || W2
|-  style="text-align:center; background:#bfb"
| 114 || August 8 || @ Twins || 8–6 || Aceves (8–1) || Perkins (3–2) || Papelbon (25) || 40,080 || Target Field || 71–43 || W3
|-  style="text-align:center; background:#bfb"
| 115 || August 9 || @ Twins || 4–3 || Albers (4–3) || Capps (3–6) || Papelbon (26) || 39,974 || Target Field || 72–43 || W4
|-  style="text-align:center; background:#fbb"
| 116 || August 10 || @ Twins || 5–2 || Perkins (4–2) || Lester (11–6) || Nathan (9) || 40,491 || Target Field || 72–44 || L1
|-  style="text-align:center; background:#bfb"
| 117 || August 12 || @ Mariners || 6–4 || Lackey (11–8) || Beavan (3–3) || Papelbon (27) || 40,682 || Safeco Field || 73–44 || W1
|-  style="text-align:center; background:#fbb"
| 118 || August 13 || @ Mariners || 5–4 || Hernández (11–10) || Beckett (9–5) || League (28) || 41,326 || Safeco Field || 73–45 || L1
|-  style="text-align:center; background:#fbb"
| 119 || August 14 || @ Mariners || 5–3 || Furbush (3–4) || Wakefield (6–5) || League (29) || 43,777 || Safeco Field || 73–46 || L2
|-  style="text-align:center; background:#bfb"
| 120 || August 16 || Rays || 3–1 || Lester (12–6) || Shields (11–10) || Papelbon (28) || 38,525 || Fenway Park || 74–46 || W1
|-  style="text-align:center; background:#fbb"
| 121 || August 16 || Rays || 6–2 || Niemann (8–4) || Bédard (4–8) ||  || 38,278 || Fenway Park || 74–47 || L1
|-  style="text-align:center; background:#fbb"
| 122 || August 17 || Rays || 4–0 || Price (11–10) || Lackey (11–9) ||  || 37,747 || Fenway Park || 74–48 || L2
|-  style="text-align:center; background:#bfb"
| 123 || August 18 || @ Royals || 4–3 || Beckett (10–5) || Hochevar (8–10) || Papelbon (29) || 20,547 || Kauffman Stadium || 75–48 || W1
|-  style="text-align:center; background:#bfb"
| 124 || August 19 || @ Royals || 7–1 || Miller (5–1) || Francis (4–14) || Aceves (2) || 21,262 || Kauffman Stadium || 76–48 || W2
|-  style="text-align:center; background:#fbb"
| 125 || August 20 || @ Royals || 9–4 || Paulino (2–9) || Albers (4–4) ||  || 28,588 || Kauffman Stadium || 76–49 || L1
|-  style="text-align:center; background:#bfb"
| 126 || August 21 || @ Royals || 6–1 || Lester (13–6) || Duffy (3–8) || || 25,723 || Kauffman Stadium || 77–49 || W1
|-  style="text-align:center; background:#fbb"
| 127 || August 22 || @ Rangers || 4–0 || Wilson (13–5) || Bédard (4–9) ||  || 33,920 || Rangers Ballpark || 77–50 || L1 
|-  style="text-align:center; background:#bfb"
| 128 || August 23 || @ Rangers || 11–5 || Lackey (12–9) || Lewis (11–9) ||  || 25,705 || Rangers Ballpark || 78–50 || W1 
|-  style="text-align:center; background:#bfb"
| 129 || August 24 || @ Rangers || 13–2 || Beckett (11–5) || Harrison (10–9) ||  || 30,724 || Rangers Ballpark || 79–50 || W2 
|-  style="text-align:center; background:#bfb"
| 130 || August 25 || @ Rangers || 6–0 || Miller (6–1) || Ogando (12–6) ||  || 29,729 || Rangers Ballpark || 80–50 || W3
|-  style="text-align:center; background:#fbb"
| 131 || August 26 || Athletics || 15–5 || González (11–11) || Wakefield (6–6) ||  || 38,239 || Fenway Park || 80–51 || L1
|-  style="text-align:center;background:#ddd;"
|colspan="11" | August 27: Hurricane Irene forced Saturday doubleheader vs. OAK (link)
|-  style="text-align:center; background:#bfb"
| 132 || August 27 || Athletics || 9–3 || Lester (14–6) || Moscoso (6–8) ||  || 37,314 || Fenway Park || 81–51 || W1
|-  style="text-align:center; background:#bfb"
| 133 || August 27 || Athletics || 4–0 || Aceves (9–1) || Godfrey (1–2) ||  || 37,039 || Fenway Park || 82–51 || W2
|-  style="text-align:center; background:#ddd;"
|colspan="11" | Normal schedule resumes
|-  style="text-align:center; background:#fbb"
| 134 || August 30 || Yankees || 5–2 || Sabathia (18–7) || Lackey (12–10) || Rivera  (35) || 37,773 || Fenway Park || 82–52 || L1
|-  style="text-align:center; background:#bfb"
| 135 || August 31 || Yankees || 9–5 || Beckett (12–5) || Hughes (4–5) || || 38,021 || Fenway Park || 83–52 || W1
|-

|-  style="text-align:center; background:#fbb"
| 136 || September 1 || Yankees || 4–2 || Wade (3–0) || Aceves (9–2) || Rivera (36) || 38,074 || Fenway Park || 83–53 || L1
|-  style="text-align:center; background:#fbb"
| 137 || September 2 || Rangers || 10–0 || Holland (13–5) || Miller (6–2) ||  || 38,083 || Fenway Park || 83–54 || L2
|-  style="text-align:center; background:#bfb"
| 138 || September 3 || Rangers || 12–7 || Bédard (5–9) || Lewis (11–10) ||  || 37,806 || Fenway Park || 84–54 || W1
|-  style="text-align:center; background:#fbb"
| 139 || September 4 || Rangers || 11–4 || Harrison (11–9) || Lackey (12–11) ||  || 37,744 || Fenway Park || 84–55 || L1
|-  style="text-align:center; background:#fbb"
| 140 || September 5 || @ Blue Jays || 1–0 (11) || Camp (3–3) || Wheeler (2–2) ||  || 27,573 || Rogers Centre || 84–56 || L2
|-  style="text-align:center; background:#bfb"
| 141 || September 6 || @ Blue Jays || 14–0 || Lester (15–6) || Perez (3–3) ||  || 17,565 || Rogers Centre || 85–56 || W1
|-  style="text-align:center; background:#fbb"
| 142 || September 7 || @ Blue Jays || 11–10 || Camp (4–3) || Bard (2–6) || Francisco (13) || 16,154 || Rogers Centre || 85–57 || L1
|-  style="text-align:center; background:#fbb"
| 143 || September 8 || @ Blue Jays || 7–4 || Romero (14–10) || Miller (6–3) ||  || 17,189 || Rogers Centre || 85–58 || L2
|-  style="text-align:center; background:#fbb"
| 144 || September 9 || @ Rays || 7–2 || Davis (10–8) || Lackey (12–12) ||  || 18,482 || Tropicana Field || 85–59 || L3
|-  style="text-align:center; background:#fbb"
| 145 || September 10 || @ Rays || 5–6 (11) || Gomes (2–1) || Bard (2–7) ||  || 24,566 || Tropicana Field || 85–60 || L4
|-  style="text-align:center; background:#fbb"
| 146 || September 11 || @ Rays || 1–9 || Shields (15–10) || Lester (15–7) ||  || 25,220 || Tropicana Field || 85–61 || L5
|-  style="text-align:center; background:#bfb"
| 147 || September 13 || Blue Jays || 18–6 || Wakefield (7–6) || Morrow (9–11) ||  || 38,020 || Fenway Park || 86–61 || W1
|-  style="text-align:center; background:#fbb"
| 148 || September 14 || Blue Jays || 4–5 || Romero (15–10) || Bard (2–8) || Francisco (15) || 37,087 || Fenway Park || 86–62 || L1
|-  style="text-align:center; background:#fbb"
| 149 || September 15 || Rays || 9–2 || Hellickson (13–10) || Weiland (0–2) ||  || 38,071 || Fenway Park || 86–63 || L2
|-  style="text-align:center; background:#bfb"
| 150 || September 16 || Rays || 4–3 || Beckett (13–5) || Shields (15–11) || Papelbon (30) || 38,019 || Fenway Park || 87–63 || W1
|-  style="text-align:center; background:#fbb"
| 151 || September 17 || Rays || 4–3 || Niemann (11–7) || Lester (15–8) || Peralta (4) || 37,682 || Fenway Park || 87–64 || L1
|-  style="text-align:center; background:#fbb"
| 152 || September 18 || Rays || 8–5 || McGee (3–1) || Wakefield (7–7) || Peralta (5) || 37,613 || Fenway Park || 87–65 || L2
|-  style="text-align:center; background:#fbb"
| 153 || September 19 || Orioles || 6–5 || Guthrie (9–17) || Weiland (0–3) || Johnson (7) || 37,885 || Fenway Park || 87–66 || L3
|-  style="text-align:center; background:#bfb"
| 154 || September 19 || Orioles || 18–9 || Atchison (1–0) || Matusz (1–8) ||  || 37,261 || Fenway Park || 88–66 || W1
|-  style="text-align:center; background:#fbb"
| 155 || September 20 || Orioles || 7–5 || Eyre (2–1) || Bard (2–9) || Johnson (8) || 37,414 || Fenway Park || 88–67 || L1
|-  style="text-align:center; background:#fbb"
| 156 || September 21 || Orioles || 6–4 || Rapada (2–0) || Beckett (13–6) || Johnson (9) || 38,004 || Fenway Park || 88–68 || L2
|-  style="text-align:center; background:#bbb"
| 157 || September 23 || @ Yankees ||colspan=7| Postponed (rain); Makeup: September 25 as part of a Doubleheader || Rain4
|-  style="text-align:center; background:#fbb"
| 158 || September 24 || @ Yankees || 9–1 ||García (12–8) || Lester (15–9) || || 49,556 || Yankee Stadium || 88–69 || L3
|-  style="text-align:center; background:#fbb"
| 159 || September 25 || @ Yankees || 6–2 ||Burnett (11–11)||Wakefield (7–8)|| || 49,541 ||  Yankee Stadium || 88–70 || L4
|-  style="text-align:center; background:#bfb"
| 159 || September 25 || @ Yankees || 7–4 (14) || Morales (1–2) || Proctor (2–5) || Doubront (1) || 49,072 || Yankee Stadium || 89–70 || W1
|-  style="text-align:center; background:#fbb"
| 160 || September 26 || @ Orioles || 6–3 || Patton (2–1) || Beckett (13–7) ||  || 21,786 || Camden Yards || 89–71 || L1
|-  style="text-align:center; background:#bfb"
| 161 || September 27 || @ Orioles || 7–6 || Aceves (10–2) || Britton (11–11) || Papelbon (31) || 22,123 || Camden Yards || 90–71 || W1
|- style="text-align:center; background:#993333; color:white;"
| 162 || September 28 || @ Orioles || 4–3 || Johnson (6–5) || Papelbon (4–1) ||  || 29,749 || Camden Yards || 90–72 || L1
|-

Players stats

Batting
Note: ## = Player number; G = Games played; AB = At bats; R = Runs scored; H = Hits; 2B = Doubles; 3B = Triples; HR = Home runs; RBI = Runs batted in; BB = Base on balls; SO = Strikeouts; SB = Stolen bases; AVG = Batting average

Source: « Boston Red Sox Batting Stats »

Pitching
Note: ## = Player number; W = Wins; L = Losses; ERA = Earned run average; G = Games pitched; GS = Games started; SV = Saves; SVO = Saves opportunities; IP = Innings pitched; H = Hits allowed; R= Runs; ER = Earned runs allowed; HR = Home runs allowed; BB = Walks allowed;  SO = Strikeouts 

Source: « Boston Red Sox Pitching Stats »

Awards and honors 
 Carl Crawford – AL Player of the Week (May 23–29)
 Jacoby Ellsbury – Silver Slugger Award (OF), Gold Glove Award (OF), AL Player of the Week (June 6–12)
 Adrián González – Silver Slugger Award (1B), Gold Glove Award (1B), AL Player of the Month (June), AL Player of the Week (August 22–28)
 David Ortiz – Silver Slugger Award (DH), AL Player of the Week (May 30–June 5)
 Dustin Pedroia – Gold Glove Award (2B), AL Player of the Month (July)

All-Star Game
 Josh Beckett, reserve P
 Jacoby Ellsbury, reserve OF
 Adrián González, starting 1B
 Jon Lester, reserve P (roster replacement)
 David Ortiz, starting DH
 Kevin Youkilis, reserve 3B (roster replacement)

Farm system

Source:

Amateur draft
Boston's selections during the first five rounds of the 2011 MLB draft were as follows:

Additionally, the team selected Travis Shaw in the 9th round, Daniel Gossett in the 16th round, and Mac Williamson in the 46th round.

Each of the above listed draftees went on to play in MLB, with Barnes being the last to leave the Red Sox organization, in January 2023.

References

External links

2011 Boston Red Sox season at Baseball Reference
2011 Boston Red Sox season Official Site 
2011 Boston Red Sox season at ESPN
2011 Boston Red Sox season at USA Today
2011 Boston Red Sox Draft Selections 

Boston Red Sox seasons
Boston Red Sox
Boston Red Sox
Red Sox